Dante Alighieri, is a public artwork by Italian artist Ettore Ximenes, located at Meridian Hill Park in Washington, D.C., United States. Dante Alighieri was originally surveyed as part of the Smithsonian Institution's Save Outdoor Sculpture! survey in 1994. The monument is a tribute to Italian poet Dante Alighieri.

Description

The statue depicts Dante standing wearing a robe and a laurel wreath upon his head. At his proper right side he holds a copy of The Divine Comedy in his hands. The statue rests on a granite base (6 ft. 7 in. x 4 ft. 10 in.). The proper right side of the bronze is signed by Ximenes and the rear of the figure is stamped with the founders mark for Roman Bronze Works.

The front of the base features the inscription: DANTE

And on the back of the base is inscribed:

DANTE ALIGHIERI
PRESENTED TO THE
CITY OF WASHINGTON
IN BEHALF OF THE
ITALIANS IN THE
UNITED STATES BY
COMM CARLO BARSOTTI

Acquisition and dedication

Dante is a casting of a statue located at Dante Park in New York City. The founder of Dante Park and editor of Il Progresso Italiano-Americano, Carlo Barsotti, donated the replica in 1921 as a tribute to Italian Americans. The total cost of the statue reached upwards of $20,000 and weighs at least 3,000 pounds. 

The statue was dedicated on December 1, 1921, as a "gift of the Italians of the United States." Barsotti, also head of the Dante Memorial Commission of New York, gave a speech, as well as M. Rene Viviani on behalf of the French people, and Italian ambassador Vittorio Rolandi Ricci. President Warren G. Harding and his wife also attended the dedication.

Dante was covered in Italian and American flags and was unveiled by Clarence Caldwell and Minne Elizabeth Sherrill, the children of the Commissioner of Public Buildings and Grounds at the time. Other notables who attended the event included the French Ambassador of the time and his wife, the President of the Italian Delegation Carlo Schanzer, the High Commissioner of Italy, Signor Quattrone, and numerous military and Italian community members. Music was played, celebrating Italian and American heritage and contemporary culture of the time.

Italian poet and scholar Giovanni Pascoli believed that this was the best figure of Dante ever sculpted after viewing a version of the work in Ximenes' studio. When influenced by art critic Florence Brooks about the sculpture and the public reception of it Ximenes was quoted as saying "That is not for me or you to say but for the public, for posterity. Every work performed by an artist is a page in history."

The sculpture was founded by Roman Bronze Works in New York City.

Donor
Carlo Barsotti was born in Pisa, Italy in 1850. In 1880 he founded the Progresso Italo-Americano newspaper in New York City. King Umberto I of Italy rewarded him the distinction of the title Chevalier in 1888.  With numerous awards from the country of Venezuela and the Italian Red Cross, he was quite the Italian figure in late 19th century America.

Condition
This sculpture was surveyed in 1994 for its condition and was described as "well maintained."

References

External links
Dante statue listed on dcMemorials
"How did a twelve-foot bronze statue of Dante Alighieri end up in Washington’s Meridian Hill Park?" from the Italian Cultural Society of Washington, D.C.

1921 sculptures
Artworks in the collection of the National Park Service
Presidency of Warren G. Harding
Bronze sculptures in Washington, D.C.
Cultural depictions of Dante Alighieri
Meridian Hill/Malcolm X Park
Monuments and memorials in Washington, D.C.
Statues of writers
Sculptures of men in Washington, D.C.